The Indian Association for Research in Computing Science (IARCS) provides leadership in computing within India. Its members are leading researchers in Computer Science drawn from major institutions from all over the country. Madhavan Mukund is the President of the association as of 2016.

IARCS aims at promoting excellence in Computing. It does so by facilitating interaction amongst its members, acting as a bridge between Academia and Industry and finally by elevating the quality of Computer Science education within the country.

IARCS runs the hugely successful and the longest running conference in computer science in India; International Conference on Foundations of Software Technology and Theoretical Computer Science. The FSTTCS conference is in its 26th year. Since its inception in 1981, the conference (held in the month of December) has helped in nurturing and creating an environment for exchange of ideas amongst the research community in the country by attracting top scientists around the world to the conference.

IARCS recognizes the impact of computing science in school education. To actively promote good practices, it has become involved in the International Olympiad in Informatics (IOI). IARCS is involved in all aspects of training and selection of the young talent to represent the country at this prestigious Olympiad. It also recognizes a role for itself in correcting the biases in the current curriculum for computer science in the country. The national program is called Indian Computing Olympiad.

IARCS has also initiated a new program to teach the teachers as a way of spreading knowledge down to the grassroots level.

External links
 Official website

Computer science organizations